Brachyurophis australis (coral snake) is a species of snake from the family Elapidae  (common names - eastern shovel-nosed snake, coral snake, Australian coral snake) and is a species endemic to Australia. Its common name reflects its shovel nose specialisation.

Description 
The eastern shovel-nosed snake is an oviparous, venomous, and a small mainly nocturnal, burrowing snake.

Taxonomy 
Brachyurophis australis is one of eight currently recognised species within the genus Brachyurophis. It was first described by Gerard Krefft in 1864 as Simotes australis.

Distribution & habitat 
Brachyurophis australis is found in eastern Australia,  in South Australia,  Victoria, inland New South Wales and in  eastern Queensland, in forest, savannah and shrubland.

Conservation status 
The conservation status of B. australis is assessed by the Queensland Government as being of "Least Concern" and is similarly assessed by  the IUCN.

References

External links 

 Brachyurophis australis occurrence data from Atlas of Living Australia
 Brachyurophis australis: images from Inaturalist

Snakes of Australia
Taxa named by Gerard Krefft
australis